The pairs competition in artistic roller skating at the 2017 World Games took place from 22 to 23 July 2017 at the Sports and Recreation Centre in Świdnica, Poland.

Competition format
A total of 6 pairs entered the competition. Short program and long program were held.

Results

References 

 
2017 World Games